Coalition Labour was a description used by candidates in the 1918 United Kingdom general election who identified with trade unionism and supported the outgoing coalition government, which retained power at the election. The Labour Party had left the coalition earlier in 1918; most Coalition Labour candidates were former Labour Members of Parliament (MPs). 

When Labour withdrew from the coalition, four of its MPs preferred to remain as ministers: G. N. Barnes, James Parker, George Henry Roberts and George Wardle.  They, along with the National Sailors' and Firemen's Union-sponsored candidate John R. Bell, contested the election independently of the Labour Party, and were termed "Coalition Labour" candidates.  Only Bell and Parker received a Coalition Coupon, and they were wrongly identified in official coalition literature as Coalition National Democratic and Labour Party and Coalition Liberal candidates, respectively.  The National Democratic and Labour Party was a separate organisation which also supported the Coalition and had a background in the Labour Party.

Of the five candidates in the 1918 General Election, the four former ministers were successful:

Following the election, the four ministers continued in position. Stephen Walsh, who had been elected as a Labour Party candidate, also agreed to join the coalition government.  However, he was sponsored by the Lancashire and Cheshire Miners' Federation, which voted against his participation, and he therefore left the government a few days later.

Of the remaining four Coalition Labour MPs, Wardle resigned in 1920 due to poor health, and Barnes retired at the 1922 United Kingdom general election.  Parker and Roberts stood in that election; as the coalition had ended, they were termed independent candidates, and only Roberts won his seat.  He stood again at the 1923 United Kingdom general election, as a Conservative Party candidate, but was then defeated.

References

Labour Party (UK) breakaway groups
Political parties established in 1918
Political parties disestablished in 1922
1918 establishments in the United Kingdom
1922 disestablishments in the United Kingdom